Sportklub Niederösterreich St. Pölten is an Austrian women's football team, based in St. Pölten.

The women's team was formed in 2006 at the club ASV Spratzern, then from 2013 to 2016 played under the name FSK St. Pölten-Spratzern. They connected to the men's club for the 2016–17 season. The team currently competes in the ÖFB-Frauenliga, the top level league of women's football in Austria. The team won the national ÖFB Ladies Cup in 2013 and 2014, as well the consecutive league and cup doubles from 2015 to 2017.

History

ASV Spratzern was founded in 1920 and a club women's section was established in 2006.

The team was promoted to the top-level league in 2010-11 season. In the 2012–13 season they secured a top two finish behind SV Neulengbach, enough to secure Austria's second UEFA Women's Champions League spot. They played in the 2013–14 UEFA Women's Champions League round of 32, but were defeated by Torres of Italy.

The team was renamed in 2013 to include the larger town of St. Pölten and FSK  set focus on being a women's club.

In 2015 the team won their first championship. Their title ended a twelve-year title-winning streak from Neulengbach. The defended the title one year later.

In 2016 the team connected to the SKN St. Pölten.

Continental record

Players

Current squad

Former players
For details of current and former players, see :Category:FSK St. Pölten-Spratzern players.

Honours
7 ÖFB-Frauenliga titles: 2014-2015, 2015-2016, 2016–2017, 2017-2018, 2018-2019, 2020-21, 2021-22,
8 ÖFB Ladies Cup titles: 2013, 2014, 2015, 2016, 2017, 2018, 2019, 2022,

References

External links
 Official website 

Women's football clubs in Austria
Association football clubs established in 2013
2013 establishments in Austria
Sankt Pölten